Greatest Hits is a singles compilation album by American recording artist Alexander O'Neal, released on 23 August 2004. Greatest Hits comprises fifteen best-selling singles released between 1985 and 1993.

Track listing
All songs written and composed by James Harris and Terry Lewis, except where noted.

 "Never Knew Love Like This" – 5:16
 "Innocent / Alex 9000 / Innocent II" – 10:33
 "Fake" – 4:02
 "All True Man" – 5:05
 "Criticize" (Alexander O'Neal, Garry Johnson) – 4:04
 "Saturday Love" (Cherrelle featuring Alexander O'Neal) – 5:01
 "If You Were Here Tonight" (Monte Moir) – 6:05
 "Hearsay '89" – 3:42
 "(What Can I Say) To Make You Love Me" – 4:31
 "The Lovers" – 4:44
 "What's Missing" – 5:44
 "A Broken Heart Can Mend" – 3:45
 "What is This Thing Called Love?" – 6:07
 "You Were Meant to Be My Lady (Not My Girl)" – 4:12
 "Love Makes No Sense" (Tony Tolbert, Lance Alexander) – 4:23

Charts

Peak positions
Original release

Sales and certifications

References

External links

Alexander O'Neal albums
2004 greatest hits albums
Albums produced by Jimmy Jam and Terry Lewis